Tonna allium, common name the costate tun,  is a species of large sea snail, a marine gastropod mollusk in the family Tonnidae, the tun shells.

Description
The size of an adult shell varies between 50 mm and 131 mm.

Distribution
This species occurs in the Indian Ocean off Madagascar, the Mascarene Basin and Mauritius.

References

 Martin, K. (1879-1880). Die Tertiärschichten auf Java, nach den Entdeckungen von Fr. Junghuhn. Leiden: Brill. [Paleontologischer Theil, 1–126 (1879); 127–164, i–vi (plate captions) (1880); Allgemeiner Theil, 1–51 (1880); Anhang, 1–6 (1880); Title page and Vorwort, i–ix,
 Smith, E. A. 1906. On South African marine Mollusca, with descriptions of new species. Annals of the Natal Government Museum 1:19-71, pls. 7-8
 Dautzenberg, Ph. (1929). Mollusques testacés marins de Madagascar. Faune des Colonies Francaises, Tome III 
 Cernohorsky. W. O. (1972). Marine Shells of the Pacific. Vol. II. Pacific Publications, Sydney, 411 pp.
 Drivas, J. & M. Jay (1988). Coquillages de La Réunion et de l'île Maurice
 Michel, C. (1988). Marine molluscs of Mauritius. Editions de l'Ocean Indien. Stanley, Rose Hill. Mauritius
 Bozzetti L. & Ferrario M. (2005) Three new species and a new subspecies from the South-Western Indian Ocean (Gastropoda: Prosobranchia: Turbinidae, Tonnidae, Buccinidae, Conidae). Visaya 1(4): 51-58. [April 2005]
 Steyn, D. G.; Lussi, M. (2005). Offshore Shells of Southern Africa: A pictorial guide to more than 750 Gastropods. Published by the authors. pp. i–vi, 1–289.
 Beu, A. G. (2005) Neogene fossil tonnoidean gastropods of Indonesia. Scripta Geologica 130, p. 1-186, pp. 166, figs. 327
 Vos, C. (2007). A conchological Iconography (No. 13) - The family Tonnidae. 123 pp., 30 numb. plus 41 (1 col.) un-numb. text-figs, 33 maps., 63 col. pls, Conchbooks, Germany
 Vos, C. (2008) Tonnidae. in Poppe G.T. (ed.) Philippine Marine Mollusks, Volume 1: Gastropoda 1: 594-611, pls 242-250. Conchbooks, Hackenheim, Germany.
 Liu, J.Y. [Ruiyu] (ed.). (2008). Checklist of marine biota of China seas. China Science Press. 1267 pp.
 Vos, C. (2012) Overview of the Tonnidae (MOLLUSCA: GASTROPODA) in Chinese waters. Shell Discoveries 1(1); pp. 12-22; Pls. 1-9
 Vos, C. (2013) Overview of the Tonnidae (Mollusca: Gastropoda) in Chinese waters. Gloria Maris 52(1-2); pp. 22-53; Pls. 1-9
 Severns, M. (2011). Shells of the Hawaiian Islands - The Sea Shells. Conchbooks, Hackenheim. 564 pp.

External links
 gastropods.com : Tonna (Dolium complex) allium; accessed : 26 April 2011
 Menke, K. T. (1828). Synopsis methodica molluscorum generum omnium et specierum earum, quae in Museo Menkeano adservantur; cum synonymia critica et novarum specierum diagnosibus. XII + 91 pp.
 Dillwyn, 1817. A descriptive catalogue of Recent shells, arranged according to the Linnean method; with particular attention to the synonymy. London: John and Arthur Arch. Vol. 1: 1-580; Vol. 2: 581-1092 + index
 Röding, P. F. (1798). Museum Boltenianum sive Catalogus cimeliorum e tribus regnis naturæ quæ olim collegerat Joa. Fried Bolten, M. D. p. d. per XL. annos proto physicus Hamburgensis. Pars secunda continens Conchylia sive Testacea univalvia, bivalvia & multivalvia. Trapp, Hamburg. viii, 199 pp.
 Schröter, J. S. in Martini, F.H.W. (1788) Vollstandiges alphabetisches Namen-Register über alle Zehn Bande des von dem feel. Herrn D. Martini in Berlin angefangenen, und vom Herrn Pastor Chemnitz in Kopenhagen fortgesetzten und vollenbeten Systematisches Conchylien-Cabinets. Nürnberg, in der Rasplichen Buchhandlung, 1788
 Martini, F. H. W. (1777) Neues systematisches Conchylien-Cabinet. Nach der Natur gezeichnet und mit lebendigen Farben erleuchtet. III
 Hanley, S. (1860). Systematic list of the species of Dolium restricted. Proceedings of the Zoological Society of London. 1859, 27: 487-493.
 Boettger, O. (1883). Mollusca. In Verbeek, R. D. M., Boettger, O. & von Fritsch, K. (Eds.) Die Tertiärformation von Sumatra und ihre Thierreste. Palaeontographica, Supplement. 3(10/11), pp. 1-151
 Deshayes, G. P. & Milne-Edwards, H. (1844). Histoire naturelle des animaux sans vertèbres, présentant les caractères généraux et particuliers de ces animaux, leur distribution, leurs classes, leurs familles, leurs genres, et la citation des principales espèces qui s'y rapportent, par J. B. P. A. de Lamarck. Deuxième édition, Tome dixième. Histoire des Mollusques. J. B. Baillière: Paris. 638 pp.

Tonnidae
Molluscs of the Indian Ocean
Gastropods described in 1817
Taxa named by Lewis Weston Dillwyn